Thiruvaikavur is a village in the Papanasam taluk of Thanjavur district, Tamil Nadu, India. The village is famous for the Tiruvaikavur temple.

Demographics 

As per the 2001 census, Thiruvaikavur had a total population of 4622 with 2306 males and 2316 females. The sex ratio was 1004. The literacy rate was 60.63.

References 

 

Villages in Thanjavur district